Margery Lilian Edith Fisher (née Turner) 1913–1992 was a British literary critic and academic. She was internationally renowned for her influence in promoting the importance of good literature for children. This came about through her books, world lecture tours and her own notable journal Growing Point. Her papers for the period 1937–1992 are held in the Department of Special Collections at the University of California. She was a recipient of the Eleanor Farjeon Award.

Biography
She was born in Camberwell, London in 1913 but spent her schooldays in New Zealand before returning to England to take up a place at Somerville College, Oxford where she graduated with First Class honours in English. After graduation she taught English at a girls' school before moving to Oundle, an English public school for boys (1939–1945). She once confided that:

teaching straightforward boys, gently leading a football-thickie towards The Mayor of Casterbridge was far more enjoyable than dealing with devious girls as a new graduate before the war

By the 1950s, married to the British naturalist James Fisher and raising six children of their own, including the publisher Edmund Fisher, she was able to indulge her voracious passion for children's literature as a freelance book reviewer for magazines. This led to the publication in 1961 of her authoritative  guide, Intent Upon Reading. In 1962 the first issue of her own journal, Growing Point, appeared, described as "Margery Fisher's regular review of books for the growing families of the English reading world and for readers, teachers, librarians and other guardians". Its publication nine times a year continued uninterrupted for the next 30 years. It ceased publication in 1992, only months before her death.

Works
 Who's Who in Children's Books A Treasury Of The Familiar characters Of Childhood, Weidenfeld & Nicolson, 1975,    'Elucidates the distinctive qualities and circumstances of popular, important, and interesting central characters of children's books and stories, and their creator's techniques, from King Alfred and Alice to Winnie-the-Pooh and the Wombles.'
 Open the Door. Brockhampton Press Limited. 1965 (A collection of writing for young children edited and presented by Margery Fisher)

References

1913 births
1992 deaths
English literary critics
Women literary critics
Children's literature criticism
English schoolteachers
British women academics
English women non-fiction writers
Alumni of Somerville College, Oxford
British expatriates in New Zealand